Basilio Sancho Agudo (born 2 January 1984), simply known as Basilio, is a Spanish footballer who plays for CF Rayo Majadahonda as a goalkeeper.

Club career
Born in Madrid, Basilio represented Rayo Vallecano and CDC Moscardó as a youth, making his senior debut for the latter in 2003. In 2005 he moved to Atlético Madrid, but only appeared for the club's C and B-teams.

In 2009, after representing CD Cobeña and Getafe CF B, Basilio joined Tercera División side CF Fuenlabrada. An undisputed starter for the side, he achieved promotion to Segunda División B in 2012 but left the club in 2014.

In August 2014, Basilio moved abroad and joined Indian Super League side Atlético de Kolkata. However, he failed to appear a single minute after being a third-choice behind Apoula Edel and Subhasish Roy Chowdhury.

On 1 January 2015 Basilio returned to Spain, joining CF Trival Valderas in the fourth division. On 20 May, he signed a short-term deal with CF Talavera de la Reina to play for the club in the play-offs.

On 7 July 2015, Basilio moved to CF Rayo Majadahonda in the third tier. An immediate first-choice, he contributed with 37 appearances during the 2017–18 season as his side achieved promotion to Segunda División for the first time ever.

On 19 August 2018, aged 34, Basilio made his professional debut by starting in a 1–2 away loss against Real Zaragoza.

References

External links

1984 births
Living people
Footballers from Madrid
Spanish footballers
Association football goalkeepers
Segunda División players
Segunda División B players
Tercera División players
Divisiones Regionales de Fútbol players
Atlético Madrid C players
Atlético Madrid B players
Getafe CF B players
CF Fuenlabrada footballers
CF Trival Valderas players
CF Rayo Majadahonda players
ATK (football club) players
Spanish expatriate footballers
Expatriate footballers in India
Spanish expatriate sportspeople in India